Carole Howald (born 29 March 1993 in Langenthal) is a Swiss curler from Langenthal. She currently plays second on Team Silvana Tirinzoni.

Career
Howald joined the Binia Feltscher rink at lead in 2017. She previously played with Melanie Barbezat and with this rink won the 2014 Dumfries Curling Challenge. They played in three Grand Slams in her first season with the team, qualifying in one of them, the 2017 Boost National. She got to play in her first official World Championship at the 2018 World Women's Curling Championship after being the alternate at her previous three appearances. The team struggled that week, failing to reach the playoffs after posting a 5–7 record. At the conclusion of the 2017–18 season, Irene Schori left the team and Howald was promoted to third. The team almost made it to the World Championships that season, but were bested by Silvana Tirinzoni 8–7 in the final.

Team Feltscher had a slow start to the 2019–20 season, failing to make the playoffs in their first four events. Howald got to throw fourth rocks for the team at the 2019 AMJ Campbell Shorty Jenkins Classic with Michèle Jäggi stepping in to skip the team. They finished with a 1-3 record. They played in just one slam event, the 2019 Tour Challenge Tier 2 and lost in the quarterfinals. The Feltscher rink finished third at both the 2019 Changan Ford International Curling Elite and the Schweizer Cup. They picked it up in the second half of the season, however, qualifying in every event. They placed third at the 2020 Swiss Women's Curling Championship. Binia Feltscher retired from competitive curling at the end of the season and the team disbanded.

Howald and second Stefanie Berset joined the Irene Schori rink for the 2020–21 season. The team competed in two tour events during the abbreviated season, finishing third at the 2020 Schweizer Cup and reaching the quarterfinals of the 2020 Women's Masters Basel. Team Schori was one of four teams to compete in the 2021 Swiss Women's Curling Championship, where they finished in last place with a 2–7 record after the triple round robin.

To begin the 2021–22 season, Team Schori was invited to compete alongside the men's teams at the 2021 Baden Masters. There, they finished with a 1–3 record, only beating Magnus Nedregotten of Norway. Elsewhere on tour, they won the Part II Bistro Ladies Classic over Cathy Auld and made it to two other event finals. They lost to Eve Muirhead in the final of The Challenger and to Nora Wüest in the St. Galler Elite Challenge final. They also had playoff appearances at the 2021 Women's Masters Basel, Stu Sells Toronto Tankard and the DeKalb Superspiel. Team Schori competed in one Grand Slam event, the 2021 National, where they finished with a winless 0–3 record. The team finished their season with a 2–3 record at the 2022 Swiss Women's Curling Championship, not advancing to the second round. Howald left the Schori rink at the end of the season. On May 12, it was announced that Howald would be joining the new Silvana Tirinzoni rink at second for the 2022–23 season. The team also included fourth Alina Pätz and lead Briar Schwaller-Hürlimann.

Personal life
Howald is a student, in the bachelors sciences in sport program.

Teams

References

External links

1993 births
Living people
Swiss female curlers
World curling champions
European curling champions
Swiss curling champions
People from Langenthal
Curlers at the 2022 Winter Olympics
Olympic curlers of Switzerland
Sportspeople from the canton of Bern
21st-century Swiss women